The Morgan State University Memorial Chapel, also known as the Student Center for Morgan State College, Morgan Christian Center, Morgan Interfaith Center, and Susie Carr Love Chapel, is a historic building located on the campus of Morgan State University in Baltimore, Maryland, United States. It is significant for its association with the nationally recognized African American architect who designed it, Albert Irvin Cassell. He is noteworthy for his designs for buildings at several Historically Black Colleges and Universities, including other projects at Morgan State. This was the first student center built on campus, and in addition to worship services, the building housed other social activities.

The single-story masonry structure was completed in 1941 in a modern interpretation of the Collegiate Gothic style. It was listed on the National Register of Historic Places in 2018.

References

Religious buildings and structures completed in 1941
University and college buildings on the National Register of Historic Places in Maryland
University and college chapels in the United States
Properties of religious function on the National Register of Historic Places in Baltimore
Morgan State University